The I Conference of Heads of State and Government of the CPLP, commonly known as the 1st CPLP Summit (I Cimeira da CPLP) was the 1st biennial meeting of heads of state and heads of government of the Community of Portuguese Language Countries, held at the Jerónimos Monastery in Lisbon, Portugal, on 17 July 1996.

Outcome

This summit formally created the Community of Portuguese Language Countries, also known as the Lusophone Commonwealth, after two years of multilateral negotiations and planning to create an intergovernmental organization around the community of countries with Portuguese as its official language.

Executive Secretary
Marcolino Moco, former Prime Minister of Angola, was elected to serve as the inaugural Executive Secretary of the Community of Portuguese Language Countries.

References

External links
CPLP Summits official site

CPLP Summits